Ephedrophila lucasi is a species of snout moth in the genus Ephedrophila. It was described by Paul Mabille in 1907. It is found in Tunisia.

References

Epipaschiinae
Moths described in 1907
Endemic fauna of Tunisia
Moths of Africa